The 2016 Prairie View A&M Panthers football team represented Prairie View A&M University in the 2016 NCAA Division I FCS football season. The Panthers were led by second-year head coach Willie Simmons and played their home games at Panther Stadium at Blackshear Field. They were a member of the West Division of the Southwestern Athletic Conference (SWAC). They finished the season 7–4, 7–2 in SWAC play to finish in third place in the West Division.

Schedule

Roster

References

Prairie View AandM
Prairie View A&M Panthers football seasons
Prairie View AandM Panthers football